Patrice Tardif (June 17, 1904 – May 1, 1989) was a politician Quebec, Canada and a Member of the Legislative Assembly of Quebec (MLA).

Early life

He was born on June 17, 1904 in Saint-Méthode-de-Frontenac and became a farmer.

Member of the legislature

He ran as an Action libérale nationale candidate in the district of Frontenac in the 1935 provincial election and won. Tardif joined Maurice Duplessis's Union Nationale and was re-elected in 1936, but was defeated by Liberal candidate Henri-Louis Gagnon in 1939.

Mayor

Tardif served as Mayor of Saint-Méthode from 1939 to 1947.

Cabinet Member

Tardif was re-elected in 1944 and became Minister without Portfolio. He was re-elected in 1948, but was defeated in 1952.

Legislative Councillor

He was appointed to the Legislative Council of Quebec in 1952 and represented the division of De la Vallière until the institution was abolished in 1968.

Death

He died on May 1, 1989.

Footnotes

1904 births
1989 deaths
Action libérale nationale MNAs
Mayors of places in Quebec
Union Nationale (Quebec) MLCs
Union Nationale (Quebec) MNAs
Canadian farmers
People from Chaudière-Appalaches